Brahim Asloum (born 31 January 1979 in Bourgoin-Jallieu, Isère) is a French boxer. He won the Light Flyweight Gold medal at the 2000 Summer Olympics. His Olympic win was France's first Olympic gold medal in boxing in 64 years.

Asloum is the former WBA light flyweight world champion.

Olympic results 
Defeated Mohamed Rezkalla (Egypt) 12-3
Defeated Brian Viloria (United States) 6-4
Defeated Kim Ki-Suk (South Korea) 12-8
Defeated Maikro Romero (Cuba) 13-12
Defeated Rafael Lozano (Spain) 23-10

Professional career
Asloum began his professional career in 2001 and went on a streak of 19 consecutive victories to earn a shot at WBA Flyweight Title holder Lorenzo Parra. Parra dominated the fight, dropping Asloum in the 2nd and taking a unanimous decision.
On 8 December 2007 he defeated Juan Carlos Reveco to become the WBA Light Flyweight Champion.

Asloum was inactive after the Reveco fight until his return to the ring 27 April 2009. In July 2008 the WBA changed his status from "World Champion" to "Champion in Recess." When he did return to the ring, Asloum knocked out Humberto Pool in the third round of a non-title flyweight bout.

On 6 September 2009 Asloum announced his retirement from boxing. Asloum cited his dispute with cable channel Canal Plus as the cause for him to stop boxing. Canal Plus was the promoter of Asloum's fights.

See also
 Boxing at the 2000 Summer Olympics
 List of Olympic medalists in boxing

References

External links
 

1979 births
Living people
People from Bourgoin-Jallieu
Light-flyweight boxers
French sportspeople of Algerian descent
Boxers at the 2000 Summer Olympics
Olympic boxers of France
Olympic gold medalists for France
World boxing champions
World Boxing Association champions
Olympic medalists in boxing
French male boxers
Medalists at the 2000 Summer Olympics
Sportspeople from Isère